The Dekabristov Bridge is a steel girder bridge across the Kryukov Canal in the Admiralteysky District of Saint Petersburg, Russia. The bridge connects the Kolomensky and Kazansky Islands. It is a monument of history and culture.

Location 
Dekabristov Bridge is located along the axis of Dekabristov Street (formerly Ofitsersky Street or Officer Street).

The Mariinsky Theater is located next to the bridge.

Upstream is the Matveevsky Bridge, below the Torgovy Bridge.

The nearest metro stations are Sadovaya, Sennaya Ploschad, and Spasskaya.

Name 
Since 1798, the bridge was called Ofitsersky Bridge, having been named after Ofitsersky (Officer) street. On 6 October 1923, the bridge was renamed the Dekabristov Bridge or Decembrists Bridge.

History 
The Dekabristov Bridge was built in 1783-1787. It was made according to the standard design for the bridges of the Kryukov Canal. Dekabristov Bridge was a three-span wooden bridge on supports made of rubble masonry, and faced with granite. The central span was movable, and the side ones were girders. The author of the project is unknown.

Additional piles were hammered in places for the expansion of the supports and a concrete slab was laid. For this, part of the Kryukov Canal water was pumped out, and the work was carried out in a dry pit. New railings were also installed.

In 1990, work was carried out to replace the granite parapet.

Construction

Dekabristov Bridge is a three-span metal bridge with a continuous beam system. Here is the breakdown of the spans:  +  + . The superstructure consists of 10 riveted iron I-beams connected by transverse beams. A concrete slab is arranged on top of the beams. Under the beams in the middle span there is a concave silhouette to increase the dimensions under the bridge. The supports are made of rubble masonry with massive granite cladding.

The bridge is intended for the movement of vehicles and pedestrians. The carriageway of the bridge includes 5 lanes for traffic. The roadway and sidewalks are covered with asphalt concrete. The sidewalks are separated from the roadway by a high granite curb. Metal railings of artistic forging complete the picture.

See also
 List of bridges in Saint Petersburg

References

Further reading 
 Горбачевич К. С., Хабло Е. П. Почему так названы? О происхождении названий улиц, площадей, островов, рек и мостов Ленинграда. — 3-е изд., испр. и доп. — Л.: Лениздат, 1985. — С. 109. — 511 с.
 Горбачевич К. С., Хабло Е. П. Почему так названы? О происхождении названий улиц, площадей, островов, рек и мостов Санкт-Петербурга. — 4-е изд., перераб. — СПб.: Норинт, 1996. — С. 73. — 359 с. — .
 Новиков Ю. В. Мосты и набережные Ленинграда / Сост. П. П. Степнов. — Л.: Лениздат, 1991. — 320 с.
 Тумилович Е. В., Алтунин С. Е. Мосты и набережные Ленинграда. Альбом. — М.: Издательство Министерства Коммунального Хозяйства РСФСР, 1963. — 298 с.

External links
 Dekabristov Bridge //SPb GBU «Mostotrest»
  Dekabristov Bridge//Saint Petersburg Bridge

Bridges in Saint Petersburg
Admiralteysky District, Saint Petersburg
Bridges completed in 1787
Cultural heritage monuments of regional significance in Saint Petersburg